Alexandru Fronea (15 November 1933 – 10 April 2013) was a Romanian football defender who played for Romania in the 1960 European Nations' Cup.

Club career
He was a member of FC Petrolul Ploiești's "golden generation". He became national champion two times with Petrolul, in 1958 and 1959 and won the Romanian Cup in 1963.

International career
Fronea earned his one and only cap for the Romania on 29 May 1960 in a European Nations' Cup qualifying match against Czechoslovakia.

Honours
Petrolul Ploiești
Divizia A: 1957–58, 1958–59
Cupa României: 1962–63

References

External links
 Alexandru Fronea at Labtof.ro

1933 births
2013 deaths
Romanian footballers
Romania international footballers
Association football defenders
AFC Dacia Unirea Brăila players
Faur București players
FC Petrolul Ploiești players
Footballers from Bucharest